Expeditie Robinson 2013 is the fifteenth season of the RTL5 reality television series Expeditie Robinson first aired on August 29, 2013. It's the eight season hosted by Evi Hanssen and the second season hosted by Dennis Weening.

This is the first season without contestants from Belgium, due to lack of television ratings in Belgium.

Survivors

 Kamp Noord
 Kamp Zuid
 Mensirip
 Winnaarseiland
 Duivelseiland

Future Appearances
Edith Bosch returned to compete in Expeditie Robinson: All Stars.

External links
 Official website Expeditie Robinson at RTL5
 

Dutch reality television series
Expeditie Robinson seasons
2013 Dutch television seasons